Islam Abbasov (born 24 March 1996) is an Azerbaijani Greco-Roman wrestler. In March 2021, he qualified at the European Qualification Tournament to compete at the 2020 Summer Olympics in Tokyo, Japan. In June 2021, he won one of the bronze medals in his event at the 2021 Wladyslaw Pytlasinski Cup held in Warsaw, Poland.

In 2022, he won the gold medal in his event at the Vehbi Emre & Hamit Kaplan Tournament held in Istanbul, Turkey. He won one of the bronze medals in the 87 kg event at the European Wrestling Championships held in Budapest, Hungary.

References

External links 
 
 
 
 u23-european-championships
 1news.az

1996 births
Living people
Azerbaijani male sport wrestlers
Wrestlers at the 2019 European Games
European Games medalists in wrestling
European Games silver medalists for Azerbaijan
European Wrestling Championships medalists
Wrestlers at the 2020 Summer Olympics
Olympic wrestlers of Azerbaijan
21st-century Azerbaijani people